Judicial genre  is  a particular category of written expression of legal opinions. It shares aspects of associated with distinct Literary genre that are often characterized by distinct attributes of characteristics such as  literary technique, tone, and content. Studies indicate that there are sub genera distinctive to the US Supreme Court of the United States, and that this genre is becoming increasingly distinctive with time.

Methods of characterizing judicial genre include  metrics such as opinion length, complexity of structure for example use of complex, multi-part opinions with several concurrences and dissents.   Robert Ferguson regards Judicial Opinion as a specific literary genre 

Analysis of judicial genre is increasing in sophistication  for example with  metadiscursive analysis in recent high visibility cases. Some of the components of metadiscursive analysis include  specific uses of clarifying devices for  regular and special concurrences to both support and attack  majority opinions.

Michael Xifaras' Theory of Legal Characters   ties together literary and judicial genres  with a morphism wherein a legal actor performs in a professional role for an audience. This folds in a theaterical metaphor associated with Aristotle's judicial genre'  where the actor   persuade listeners & audience  aiming for a particular decision.

References

Legal terminology